Louise Thompson may refer to:

Louise Thompson Patterson (1901–1999), née Louise Thompson, social activist
Louise Thompson (TV personality)
Louise Thomson (curler) in 1980 Canadian Ladies Curling Association Championship